Raffaele La Capria (3 October 1922 – 26 June 2022) was an Italian novelist and screenwriter.

His second novel, The Mortal Wound (Ferito a morte), won Italy's most prestigious award, the Strega Prize, and is today considered a classic of Italian literature. Sandro Veronesi referred to it as "the best Italian novel of all time".

Biography
La Capria was born in Naples, where he was to spend the formative years of his life. There he graduated in law, before staying in France, England, and the United States and then settling in Rome. He contributed to the cultural pages of the Corriere della Sera and was co-director of the literary journal Nuovi Argomenti. A particular interest was English poetry of the 1930s: as well as writing numerous articles he translated works including T. S. Eliot's Four Quartets. In the 1950s he wrote and produced a number of radio programmes for RAI on foreign contemporary drama. In 1957 La Capria was invited to participate in the International Seminar of Literature at Harvard University. In 1961 his novel Ferito a morte won the prestigious Premio Strega.

La Capria worked as co-scriptwriter on a number of Francesco Rosi's films, including Le mani sulla città (1963), Uomini contro (1970), and Cristo si è fermato a Eboli (1979). In September 2001 he received a Premio Campiello lifetime achievement award and in 2005 L'estro quotidiano was selected as the winner of the Viareggio Prize for fiction.

La Capria was the widower of the actress Ilaria Occhini. He died in Rome on 26 June 2022, at the age of 99, 3 months shy of his 100th birthday

Bibliography 
 Un giorno d'impazienza, Milano-Roma, Bompiani, 1952; 1976.
(EN) A Day of impatience / First Affair, translated by William Weaver, Signet Books – New American Library, New York, 1955
 Ferito a morte, Milano, Bompiani, 1961. (Premio Strega)
(EN) The Mortal Wound, translated by Marguerite Waldman, Farrar, Straus And Company, 1964.
 La finestra. Sceneggiatura televisiva, con Mario Soldati, in "Sipario", a. 18, n. 202, 1963, p. 59–69.
 Amore e psiche, Milano, Bompiani, 1973. (Premio Campiello)
 Colapesce. Favola italiana, raccontata da, Milano, A. Mondadori, 1974.
 False partenze. Frammenti per una biografia letteraria, Milano, Bompiani, 1974.
 Variazioni sopra una nota sola, Roma, Cooperativa scrittori, 1977.
 Fiori giapponesi, Milano, Bompiani, 1978.
 In Lucania con Carlo Levi, con Saverio Strati, fotografia di Mario Carbone, commento di Gino Melchiorre, Cosenza, Lerici, 1979.
 Il bambino che non volle sparire, Teramo, Lisciani & Giunti, 1980.
 Tre romanzi di una giornata, Torino, Einaudi, 1982. . [contiene: Un giorno d'impazienza; Ferito a morte; Amore e psiche]
 Il genio, con Damiano Damiani, in "Sipario", a. 38, n. 440, 1984, p. 99–114. [Da Il re ferito un prologo e due tempi di Damiano Damiani]
 L'armonia perduta, Milano, A. Mondadori, 1986. (Premio Napoli )
 Una visita alla centrale nucleare, con un'acquaforte di Franco Bassignani, Brescia, L'obliquo, 1987.
 La neve del Vesuvio, Milano, A. Mondadori, 1988. . (Premio Grinzane Cavour)
 Letteratura e salti mortali, postfazione di Alfonso Berardinelli, Milano, A. Mondadori, 1990. .
 Capri e non più Capri, Milano, A. Mondadori, 1991. , (Premio Nazionale Rhegium Julii).
(EN) Capri and No Longer Capri, Thunder's Mouth Press, United States, 2017. 
 L'occhio di Napoli, Milano, A. Mondadori, 1994. . (Premio Società dei Lettori, Lucca-Roma)
 Conversazione con Raffaele La Capria. Letteratura e sentimento del tempo, con Paola Gaglianone, saggio critico di Raffaele Manica, Roma, Omicron, 1995. .
 L'apprendista scrittore, a cura di Stefania Brazzoduro, Roma, minimum fax, 1996. .
 La mosca nella bottiglia. Elogio del senso comune, Milano, Rizzoli, 1996. .
 Il sentimento della letteratura, Milano, Mondadori, 1997. .
 Campania. Immagini del XIX secolo dagli archivi Alinari, Firenze, Alinari, 1997. .
 Napolitan graffiti. Come eravamo, Milano, Rizzoli, 1998. .
 Letteratura e libertà. Colloquio di Emanuele Trevi con Raffaele La Capria, Roma, Liberal, 1999.
 Ultimi viaggi nell'Italia perduta, Cava de' Tirreni, Avagliano, 1999. .
 Lo stile dell'anatra, Milano, Mondadori, 2001. .
 Cinquant'anni di false partenze ovvero L'apprendista scrittore, introduzione di Raffaele Manica, con un omaggio di Alfonso Berardinelli, Roma, minimum fax, 2002. .
 Me visto da lui stesso. Interviste 1970–2001 sul mestiere di scrivere, a cura di Silvio Perrella, Lecce, Manni, 2002. .
 Guappo e altri animali, disegni di Giosetta Fioroni, Lugo, Associazione Culturale Il Bradipo, 2003.
 Opere, a cura e con un saggio introduttivo di Silvio Perrella, Milano, A. Mondadori, 2003. . [contiene False partenze (scelta) – Tre romanzi di una giornata; Colapesce; Fiori giapponesi; La neve del Vesuvio; L'armonia perduta; Capri e non più Capri (scelta); Ultimi viaggi nell'Italia perduta (scelta); L'occhio di Napoli (scelta); Letteratura e salti mortali; Il sentimento della letteratura; La mosca nella bottiglia; Lo stile dell'anatra]; nuova ed. rivista e accresciuta in due tomi, Milano, A. Mondadori, 2014. . [Contiene: False partenze; Il mito della bella giornata; Roma; Altre false partenze; I ritorni a Napoli; Fiori giapponesi; Letteratura, senso comune e passione civile; L'amorosa inchiesta; Esercizi superficiali; Me visto da lui stesso]
 Palazzo Donn'Anna. La memoria immaginativa, Napoli, Electa Napoli, 2004. .
 Positano in prosa, con Riccardo Bacchelli e Carlo Knight, Napoli, Guida, 2004. .
 Caro Goffredo. Dedicato a Goffredo Parise, Roma, minimum fax, 2005. .
 L'estro quotidiano, Milano, Mondadori, 2005. . (Premio Viareggio)
 Racconti. Passeggiata con clementina. Ultima passeggiata con Guappo, disegni di Lucio del Pezzo, Bagreria, Drago Artecontemporanea, 2005. 
 L'amorosa inchiesta, Milano, A. Mondadori, 2006. .
 4 storie d'amore, illustrazioni di Mimmo Paladino, Bagheria, Drago, 2007. .
 Amori, Lecce, Manni, 2008. . [brani tratti da Un giorno d'impazienza; Ferito a morte; Amore e psiche; Fiori giapponesi; Lo stile dell'anatra]
 Chiamiamolo Candido. Un'antologia personale. Introdotta e accompagnata da una conversazione con Alessandro Piperno, Napoli, L'ancora del Mediterraneo, 2008. .
 I mesi dell'anno, illustrazioni di Enrico Job, San Cesario di Lecce, Manni, 2008. .
 L'apprendista giornalista (1958–2008), San Marco in Lamis, Istituto d'istruzione secondaria superiore "Pietro Giannone"-Centro documentazione Leonardo Sciascia/Archivio del Novecento, 2008.
 A cuore aperto, Milano, Mondadori, 2009. .
 America 1957, a sentimental journey, Roma, Nottetempo, 2009. .
 Un amore al tempo della Dolce Vita, Roma, Nottetempo, 2009. .
 Napoli, Milano, Oscar Mondadori, 2009. . [contiene L'armonia perduta; L'occhio di Napoli; Napolitan graffiti]
 Confidenziale. Lettere dagli amici, Padova, Il notes magico, 2011. .
 Quando la mattina scendevo in piazzetta, Capri, La Conchiglia, 2011. .
 La nostalgia della bellezza, Milano, Pagine d'arte, 2011. . [Brani scelti da La mosca nella bottiglia]
 Esercizi superficiali. Nuotando in superficie, Milano, Mondadori, 2012. .
 Doppio misto, Milano, Mondadori, 2012. .
 La lezione del canarino, Milano, Il Sole 24 Ore, 2012. [contiene: Il peccato originale; La farfalla; La civettina; Il gufo reale; Il ciuchino; Una visita allo zoo; Il gabbiano; Il granchio; Il polpo; Gli avvoltoi; Cartoni animati; Il gatto; Lo scoiattolo; La bassotta; L'ultima passeggiata con Guappo; Caro Guappo; Il pavone; La lezione del canarino]
 Capri. L'isola il cui nome è iscritto nel mio, con Lorenzo Capellini, Argelato, Minerva, 2012. .
 Novant'anni d'impazienza. Un'autobiografia letteraria, Roma, minimum fax, 2013. .
 Umori e malumori. Diario 2012–2013, Roma, Nottetempo, 2013. .
 La bellezza di Roma, Milano, Mondadori, 2014. .
 Introduzione a me stesso, Roma, Elliot, 2014. .
 Il guarracino che andava per mare, con un'opera di Massimo Nota e una nota di Silvio Perrella, Napoli, ilfilodipartenope, 2014.
 Storia di un'amicizia tra uno scrittore e un lettore. Lettere 1995–2001, con Beppe Agosti, Milano, Archinto, 2014. .
 Al bar, con Umberto Silva, Roma, Nottetempo, 2015. .
 Ai dolci amici addio, Roma, Nottetempo, 2016. .
 Interviste con alieni, Salò, Damiani, 2016. .
 L'isola il cui nome è iscritto nel mio , Argelato, Minerva, 2016. .
 Il fallimento della consapevolezza, Milano, Mondadori, 2018. .
 Di terra e mare, con Silvio Perrella, Bari-Roma, Laterza, 2018. .
 La vita salvata. Conversazioni con Giovanna Stanzione, Milano, Mondadori, 2020. .

References

External links
 
 
The New York Times, May 17, 1964, Section BR, Page 4: Review of The Mortal Wound.

1922 births
2022 deaths
Writers from Naples
20th-century Italian novelists
20th-century Italian male writers
21st-century Italian novelists
Italian translators
English–Italian translators
Strega Prize winners
Viareggio Prize winners
Italian male novelists
21st-century Italian male writers
University of Naples Federico II alumni
20th-century translators
20th-century Italian screenwriters
Italian male screenwriters